Kuhurlui is a lake in the south-western Ukraine, in the south of Bessarabia. It is in complex of the Danube river delta.

See also
 Lake Yalpuh

References

External links

Landforms of Odesa Oblast
Kugurluy
Ramsar sites in Ukraine
Danube Delta